Iain John Sutcliffe (born 20 December 1974) is a former English cricketer who played for the cricket teams of Oxford University, Combined Universities, Leicestershire, British Universities and Lancashire. He played as a left-handed batsman, primarily as an opener in four-day cricket, and as a very occasional spin bowler. He also represented Oxford University as a middleweight boxer.

Sutcliffe joined Lancashire in 2003 and in the same season was awarded his county cap. Sutcliffe joined Northamptonshire County Cricket Club on loan towards the end of the 2007 season, only to injure himself during his first game, thus bringing his loan to a premature end.

Towards the end of the 2008 season Sutcliffe announced his retirement from first-class cricket, stating, "I've been presented with some opportunities away from cricket and I'm at a stage where I need to explore these at the earliest opportunity."
He would later teach economics and become a housemaster at Wellington College, Berkshire.

References

External links

1974 births
Living people
English cricketers
Lancashire cricketers
Leicestershire cricketers
Northamptonshire cricketers
Alumni of The Queen's College, Oxford
Cricketers from Leeds
NBC Denis Compton Award recipients
Oxford University cricketers
British Universities cricketers